The Nissan Forum is a concept minivan that debuted during the 2008 North American International Auto Show.  It became a production version of next-generation Nissan Quest (North America) and Nissan Elgrand (Asia) on the Nissan D platform for the 2011 model year.

See also
 Nissan Quest
 Nissan Elgrand
 Nissan

Forum
Front-wheel-drive vehicles
Minivans